Jollitown is a Philippine television informative show broadcast by GMA Network. The series premiered on April 13, 2008 and concluded on October 12, 2013 with a total of 82 episodes.

Overview
The show was launched to promote Jollibee's 30th anniversary, and followed Jollibee and his friends Yum, Twirlie, Hetty, and Popo through their adventures. The show left GMA Network on November 14, 2010, and moved to ABS-CBN, premiering its 4th season on July 17, 2011. The fourth season depicted the cast traveling through time. Season 5, which taught Philippine history, ended on October 14, 2012.

Jollitown returned to GMA Network as The Jollitown Kids Show on July 20, 2013. It concluded on October 12, 2013.

Ratings
According to AGB Nielsen Philippines' Mega Manila household television ratings, the final episode of The Jollitown Kids Show scored a 12.8% rating.

Accolades

References

External links
 

2008 Philippine television series debuts
2013 Philippine television series endings
ABS-CBN original programming
Filipino-language television shows
GMA Network original programming
Jollibee
Philippine children's television series
Philippine television shows featuring puppetry